Bowen House is a 22-storey office building on the corner of Lambton Quay and Bowen Street, Wellington, New Zealand, that is leased by the New Zealand Parliament to house some members of Parliament and government staff.

The building was designed by Warren and Mahoney architects. Construction began in 1988 and was completed in 1990. It has been leased by the New Zealand Parliament since 1991. It was once owned by Government Property Services, which was privatised as Capital Properties New Zealand by a National–New Zealand First coalition government in 1998.

Bowen House contained offices for the smaller parties, select committee staff, and some of the ministers and their support staff. It is connected to the Executive Wing (the Beehive) of the Parliament Buildings by an underground travelator under Bowen Street. Bowen House is part of the parliamentary security system, and the government was the only tenant in the building.

Some high-rise buildings in Wellington suffered damage in the November 2016 Kaikoura earthquake, notably Statistics House where some floors partially collapsed after separating from the walls. In December 2016 Wellington City Council ordered that building inspections be carried out in about 80 buildings including Bowen House. (By 2022 the Council had identified 150 buildings at possible risk.) The buildings affected by the order were all multi-storey, made out of reinforced concrete with precast hollow core concrete slab floors. In May 2019 engineers began investigating Bowen House, and In October 2019 Speaker of the House Trevor Mallard announced that engineers did not believe Bowen House was fully safe and that staff would be temporarily relocated so that the building could be strengthened. By February 2020 plans were underway to shift 600 staff after the building was declared to only reach 40% of the new building code. In 2021 Precinct Properties bought Bowen House, with plans to earthquake-strengthen and redevelop the building.

References

Government buildings in New Zealand
Office buildings completed in 1990
Skyscrapers in Wellington
Skyscraper office buildings in New Zealand